In mathematics, the signal magnitude area (abbreviated SMA or sma) is a statistical measure of the magnitude of a varying quantity.

Definition
The SMA value of a set of values (or a continuous-time waveform) is the normalized integral of the original values.

In the case of a set of n values  matching a time length T, the SMA

In the continuous domain, we have for example, with a 3-axis signal with an offset correction a for each axis, the following equation:

See also
 Root mean square

References

Computational statistics